Pamela Thomas is a Canadian-born television producer, director, and casting director. She served as a co-producer for The Kids in the Hall from 1988 to 1995 and has also served as a producer on I'm With Bugsey and Saturday Night Live, among others - including Sex and the City. In 2006, she directed an episode of Desperate Housewives. She was the first wife of Dave Thomas.

References

External links

American television directors
American television producers
American women television producers
American women television directors
Living people
Place of birth missing (living people)
Year of birth missing (living people)
21st-century American women